"Black Butterflies and Deja Vu" is a song by American rock band, the Maine. It is the second single off their sixth studio album Lovely Little Lonely released on March 2, 2017, premiering on Nylon Magazine. It was released digitally the following day. An acoustic version was released on July 28, 2017.

Background and composition
"Black Butterflies and Deja Vu" was written by members of the band and was produced by Colby Wedgeworth. The track runs at 168 BPM and is in the key of F major. It runs for three minutes and 23 seconds. Singer John O'Callaghan spoke about the origins of the song in an interview with Billboard.

In another interview with PopCrush, O'Callaghan revealed that the song was the hardest one they have ever had to make. The band recorded the song in Gualala, California. Their single "Sticky" released in 2021, references lyrics to "Black Butterflies and Deja Vu". It is the bands most streamed song to date.

Critical reception
"Black Butterflies and Deja Vu" was met with mostly positive reviews. Billboard complemented the instrumental work calling it, "a stunning blend of whirling guitars, propelled by Blink-182-esque drum beats." Alternative Press magazine calls the track, "jaw dropping."

Live performances
The band performed the song at Sad Summer Fest along with Grayscale singer, Collin Walsh in 2021.

Track listing
Digital download

Acoustic version

Credits and personnel
 John O'Callaghan - lead vocals
 Kennedy Brock - rhythm guitar, backing vocals
 Patrick Kirch - drums 
 Jared Monaco - lead guitar
 Garrett Nickelsen - bass guitar

Release history

References

2017 songs
The Maine (band) songs